Kukuruznik (Russian: Кукурузник) (is a Russian word derived from "kukuruza", maize. It was used as a nickname for the following.

Polikarpov Po-2, a utility aircraft used extensively in agriculture
Antonov An-2, a purpose-built agricultural aircraft
Nikita Khrushchev, leader of the Soviet Union, known for indiscriminately introducing corn throughout the Soviet Union

See also
 Ural Airlines Flight 178